József Gráf (born 16 October 1946) is a Hungarian engineer and politician, who served as Minister of Agriculture and Rural Development between 2005 and 2010.

Personal life
He is married and has three children - two daughters, Csilla and Tímea and a son, József.

References

 Bölöny, József – Hubai, László: Magyarország kormányai 1848–2004 [Cabinets of Hungary 1848–2004], Akadémiai Kiadó, Budapest, 2004 (5th edition).
 Zsigmond Király Főiskola - Jelenkutató Csoport
MTI Ki Kicsoda 2009, Magyar Távirati Iroda Zrt., Budapest, 2008, 395–396. old., ISSN 1787-288X
Életrajz a Miniszterelnöki Hivatal honlapján
Gráf József életrajza az MSZP honlapján
Gráf József életrajza az Országgyűlés honlapján

1946 births
Living people
People from Pécs
Hungarian Socialist Party politicians
Agriculture ministers of Hungary
Members of the National Assembly of Hungary (1994–1998)
Members of the National Assembly of Hungary (1998–2002)
Members of the National Assembly of Hungary (2002–2006)
Members of the Bajnai Government